Druck (English: pressure) is a German teen drama streaming television series, based on the Norwegian TV series Skam, created by Julie Andem. It premiered with its first full episode on March 23, 2018 on Funk and YouTube.

Employing the same distribution method and overall storylines as the original Norwegian production, Druck is shown in real-time through short clips on a nearly daily basis on YouTube, supplemented with screenshots of messages between the characters over WhatsApp or Telegram and compiled clips into full episodes on Friday. Real social media accounts created for the fictional characters on Instagram allow viewers greater insight into the show beyond its clips. The first of these short clips was released on March 19, 2018. On December 24, 2019 a fifth season was announced to premier summer 2020. On April 12, 2020 it was announced, that season 5 will focus on Nora Machwitz, while also introducing a new generation. On August 10, 2020 a teaser was released, announcing that season 5 would start on September 20, 2020. On September 1, 2020, Lukas von Horbatschewsky announced that a sixth season is in pre-production. On December 13, 2020, the first clip of season 6 dropped and revealed the new main, Fatou Jallow. On August 18, 2021, Druck released a teaser on instagram announcing season 7 to premier in autumn 2021. On August 31, 2021, Druck revealed on Telegram that this season would center around Isi Inci. On September 26, 2021, it was announced that the new season will start on October 24, 2021 with its first clip. On January 13, 2022, the official Instagram of the show revealed that the eighth season would begin airing in Spring 2022. On February 17, the Druck Instagram account revealed that the season would feature Mailin as its lead and on March 28, it was revealed that the season would start on April 24, 2022.

The show was nominated for the 55. Grimme-Preis 2019 and the 56. Grimme-Preis 2020, both times in the category Kids & Teens.

Premise and plot 
Druck follows a group of friends in their teen life in Berlin and deals with daily and current events, like friendship, love and the search for their own identity. Every season centers on a new character.

The first season centers on Hanna and started with the first clip on March 19, 2018. After having "stolen" her best friend's boyfriend, Hanna suddenly loses all her friends and her former crew ostracizes and nags her. Her relationship with her boyfriend Jonas suffers from this. Hanna finally finds a new group of friends who help her get a grip on her life.

The second season centers on Mia, a close friend of Hanna. Mia is a feminist and dislikes the arrogant Alexander Hardenberg, who exerts a bad influence on her friend Kiki. After Mia asks Alex to end his relationship with Kiki, she gets to know another side of Alex and slowly develops feelings for him, which in turn threatens her friendship with Kiki. The first clip for the second season was released on December 17, 2018.

The third season centers on Matteo and his relationships, both with the boys and girls in the group. While the upperclassman prepare for their final exams and graduation, Matteo struggles with the pressure from his friends to be intimate with the girl he is dating while hiding that he is actually gay. He is also grappling with mental health and family dynamics that create an increasing reliance on substances to cope with them. While he stresses about school and girls, he experiences the rise and fall of his developing romance with the mysterious new boy in school, who has his own secret. The first clip of season three was released on March 9, 2019.

The fourth season centers on Amira and the expectations put upon her by faith, family, and friends. While she prepares to find independence abroad she also wants to be true to her beliefs and to herself. There is a lot of pressure on her from the communities she belongs to, which her younger brother is also experiencing. While she helps those around her with their own difficulties, she finds a conflict between her commitment to her religion and the feelings that grow between her and Mohammed, who is not Muslim. She begins to isolate herself from the other girls, and must find a balance between all the parts of her life. The first clip of season four was released on June 8, 2019.

The fifth season centers on Nora, one of Kiki's two sisters. After breaking up with Costantin, all her former friends reject her. Her mom is alcoholic and she has to face everything on her own, since Kiki is in another city with Carlos and Zoe, her other sister, avoids staying home with their mum. She finds some new friends and a new love interest while she deals with her own mental health. COVID-19 is also one of the themes of this season. The first clip of season five was released on September 20, 2020.

The sixth season centers on Fatou, member of Nora's new group of friends. The first clip of season six was released on December 13, 2020. Fatou starts a relationship with her crush Kieu My, while facing problems at school. She discovers she has dyscalculia and because of bad marks, she might not be able to graduate. Meanwhile, her friends' group is collapsing due to some arguments. For example, Ava and Mailin fight over the theme of social justice. Although only some COVID-19 restrictions are shown on screen, the season was filmed before the new lockdown, therefore it does not reflect the real German Coronavirus situation between December and February.

The seventh season centers on Isi. The first clip of season seven was released on October 24, 2021. Having grown distant from their former clique, Ismail rekindles their friendship with childhood friend Sascha and befriends newcomer to school Lou, which will bring them closer to Constantin once more, as he also appears to be interested in Lou. The series also explores how Isi handles their non-binary identity with their loving yet absent parents and brother Umut, who is reacting increasingly negatively to his sibling’s androgynous expression.

The eighth season centers on Mailin. The first clip of the season was released on April 24, 2022.

Characters 
The following are characters in Druck.

Episodes 
The episodes listed here corresponds to the appearance on funk.net and YouTube.

Overview

Season 1 
The first season contains ten episodes and centers on Hanna Jung and her relationship with Jonas.

Season 2 
The second season contains ten episodes and centers on Mia Winter and her relationship with Alex.

Season 3 
The third season contains ten episodes and centers on Matteo Florenzi and his relationship with David.

Season 4 
The fourth season contains ten episodes and centers on Amira Thalia Mahmood. The first episode links this with the last season and the last two episodes center around Mia and Hanna and bring their story to a conclusion.

Season 5 
The fifth season contains ten episodes and centers on Nora Machwitz, younger sister of Kiki Machwitz, while also introducing a new generation.

Season 6 
The sixth season contains ten episodes and centers on Fatou Jallow.

Season 7 
The seventh season contains ten episodes. It centers on the character of Isi Inci.

Season 8 
The eighth season contains ten episodes and centers around the character of Mailin Richter. This season also concludes the stories of the "second generation" of characters introduced in season five.

References

External links 
 Website on ZDF.de (german)
 Website on funk.net (german)
 Webseite on Bantry Bay Productions (german)
 Druck on IMDb

German LGBT-related television shows
German children's television series
2010s German television series
2010s LGBT-related drama television series
Television series about teenagers